Englis may refer to:
 English language or englis in Middle English

People with the surname
 Charles M. Englis, joiner subcontractor to the W. & A. Fletcher Company
 John Englis, shipbuilder of the USRC Ashuelot
 Karel Engliš (1880–1961), Czech Minister of Finance over the Czech National Bank
 Manuel Englis, member of the Zamboanga City Council in the 2019 Zamboanga City local elections
 Miroslav Engliš, mathematician, Ph.D. student under Vlastimil Pták
 Myles Englis, player in the 2016 Big East Conference Men's Soccer Tournament
 Sunday Englis, winner of the 2020 Hollywood Makeup Artist and Hair Stylist Guild Awards for Best Period and/or Character Makeup with Nicki Ledermann and Tania Ribalow

See also
 English (disambiguation)
 Inglis (disambiguation)